Holiday is a 2010 French comedy crime film directed by Guillaume Nicloux.

Plot 
One evening, Michel Trémois fails in the pharmacy of a provincial railway station and remembers the sequence of events which, in two days, have pushed his life party weekend with his wife Nadine to rebuild their relationship and save their sexuality, nothing has finally gone as planned ... After a wild and tumultuous night embellished singular encounters, the wake-Michel is brutal and painful. He not only finds himself accused of murder but his wife was not found ...

Cast

 Jean-Pierre Darroussin as Michel Trémois
 Judith Godrèche as Nadine Trémois
 Josiane Balasko as Christiane Mercier
 Françoise Lebrun as Marie-Paule
 Biyouna as Eva Lopez
 Pascal Bongard as Richard Ponce
 Marc Rioufol as Anthony Rivière
 Scali Delpeyrat as Fabien
 Eric Naggar as M. Abraham
 Yves Verhoeven as Inspector Delteil
 Camille de Sablet as Sandy
 Stéphan Wojtowicz as Sylvain Caccia
 Nicolas Jouhet as Olivier Desanti
 Christian Drillaud as Alain
 Yveline Hamon as Danielle
 Christophe Fluder as Nicolas Ajuria
 Léna Breban as Julie Vadec
 Valérie Lang as Catherine Bazinsky
 Maxime Lefrançois as Rémi Van Groll
 Julien Prévost as Bruno

References

External links 
 
 

2010 films
Films directed by Guillaume Nicloux
French crime comedy films
2000s French films
2010s French films